Pseudorabdion mcnamarae is a species of snake in the family Colubridae. The species is endemic to the Philippines.

Etymology
The specific name, mcnamarae, is in honor of Homer McNamara who was superintendent of La Carlota Agricultural Station, Philippines, and assisted Taylor in the field.

Habitat
Pseudorabdion mcnamarae inhabits primary and secondary forests where it occurs under rotting leaves on the forest floor.

References

Further reading
Taylor EH (1917). "Snakes and lizards from Negros, with descriptions of new species and new subspecies". Philippine J. Sci. 12 (6): 353–381. (Pseudorhabdium mcnamarae, new species, pp. 363–364, Figures 2a, 2b, 2c).

Colubrids
Snakes of Asia
Reptiles of the Philippines
Endemic fauna of the Philippines
Taxa named by Edward Harrison Taylor
Reptiles described in 1917